Juha Janhunen (born 12 February 1952 in Pori, Finland) is a Finnish linguist whose wide interests include Uralic and Mongolic languages. Since 1994, he has been Professor in East Asian studies at the University of Helsinki. He has done fieldwork on Samoyedic languages and on Khamnigan Mongol. More recently, he has collaborated with Chinese scholar Wu Yingzhe to produce a critical edition of two newly discovered Liao Dynasty epitaphs written in the Khitan small script.

He is a critic of the Altaic hypothesis.

Notable works

References

External links 
Janhunen and Altaic studies profiled

1952 births
Living people
People from Pori
Swedish-speaking Finns
Linguists from Finland
Linguists of Khitan
Mongolists
Finnish Finno-Ugrists
Finnish orientalists
Academic staff of the University of Helsinki